Coleophora leucostoma is a moth of the family Coleophoridae. It is found in Uzbekistan.

The length of the forewings is about 5.5 mm for males and 4–5 mm for females. Adults are on wing from April to May.

References

leucostoma
Moths described in 1930
Moths of Asia